The Malavas (Brahmi script: 𑀫𑁆𑀫𑀸𑀭𑀯 Mmālava) or Malwas were an ancient Indian tribe. Modern scholars identify them with the Mallian people (Malloi) who were settled in the Punjab region at the time of Alexander's invasion in the 4th century BCE. Later, the Malavas migrated southwards to present-day Rajasthan, and ultimately to Madhya Pradesh and Gujarat. Their power gradually declined as a result of defeats against the Western Satraps (2nd century CE), the Gupta emperor Samudragupta (4th century), and the Chalukya emperor Pulakeshin II (7th century).

The Malwa region in central India is named after them. The Malava era, which later came to be known as Vikram Samvat, was probably first used by them.

Before Common Era 
The Malavas are mentioned in several ancient Indian texts, including the Mahabharata and Mahabhashya. According to the Mahabharata, the hundred sons of the Madra king Ashvapati, the father of Savitri were known as the Malavas, after the name of their mother, Malavi. Although Malavas are not specifically mentioned by Panini, his sutra V.3.117 mentions a group of tribes called ayudhajivi samghas (those who live by the profession of arms) and the Kashika includes the Malavas and the Kshudrakas in this group of tribes. The Malavas are also mentioned in the Mahabhashya (IV.1.68) of Patanjali.

The location of the original homeland of the Malavas is not certain, but modern scholars generally connect them with the "Malli" or "Malloi" mentioned in the ancient Greek accounts, which describe Alexander's war against them. At the time of Alexander's invasion in the 4th century BCE, the Malloi lived in present-day Punjab region, in the area to the north of the confluence of the Ravi and the Chenab rivers.

Southward migration 

Later, the Malavas (or at least a large population of them) migrated to present-day Rajasthan, possibly as a result of the Indo-Greek occupation of Punjab. They were probably headquartered at Malavanagara (present-day Nagar Fort), where several thousands of their coins have been discovered. These coins bear the legend Malavanam jayah ("victory of the Malavas"), and have been dated between 250 BCE and 250 CE. Several inscriptions dated in the Malava era have been found in various parts of Rajasthan, which suggests that the Malava influence extended to a wider part of Rajasthan.

It is also said that the Malavas, originally residing in the Punjab region, migrated to Central India/Rajasthan due to the Huna invasion.  
 
The Malavas ultimately migrated to the Malwa region in central India: this region was named after them some time after the 2nd century CE.

Conflict against the Western Satraps

Around 120 CE, the Malavas are mentioned as besieging the king of the Uttamabhadras to the south, but the Uttamabhadras were finally rescued by the Western Satraps, and the Malvas were crushed. The account appears in an inscription at the Nashik Caves, made by the Nahapana's viceroy Ushavadata:

Conflict with the Guptas 
In the 4th century CE, during the reign of the Gupta emperor Samudragupta, the Malavas most probably lived in Rajasthan and western Malwa. The Allahabad Pillar inscription of Samudragupta names the Malavas among the tribes subjugated by him:

The Aulikaras who ruled in the Malwa region may have been a Malava clan, and may have been responsible the name "Malwa" being applied to the region.

Post-Gupta period 

Post-Gupta records attest to the Malava presence in multiple regions, including present-day Madhya Pradesh and Gujarat.

Present-day Gujarat 

Xuanzang (also 7th century) locates Malava (transcribed as 摩臘婆, "Mo-la-p'o") in present-day Gujarat, describing Kheta (Kheda) and Anandapura (Vadnagar) as parts of the Malava country. Xuanzang suggests that this Malava country was a part of the Maitraka kingdom. Like Banabhatta, he describes Ujjayini ("Wu-she-yen-na") as a distinct territory, but unlike Banabhatta, he locates Malava to the west of Ujjayini. The 7th century Aihole inscription of the Chalukya king Pulakeshin II, who defeated the Malavas, also locates them in present-day Gujarat. The 9th century Rashtrakuta records state that their emperor Govinda III stationed governor Kakka in the Lata country (southern Gujarat) to check the advance of the Gurjara-Pratiharas into Malava.

Present-day Madhya Pradesh 

Although the region that ultimately came to be known as Malwa included the Ujjain, the post-Gupta records distinguish between the territory of the Malavas and the region around Ujjain. Banabhatta's Kadambari (7th century) describes Vidisha in present-day eastern Malwa as the capital of the Malavas, and Ujjayini (Ujjain) in present-day western Malwa as the capital of the distinct Avanti kingdom. This Malava king was defeated by the Pushyabhuti king Rajyavardhana around 605 CE, as attested by Banabhatta's Harshacharita as well as the Pushyabhuti inscriptions. The distinction between these Malava and Ujjain regions is also found in the writings of the 9th century Muslim historian Al-Baladhuri, who states that Junayd, the Arab governor of Sindh, raided Uzain (Ujjain) and al-Malibah (Malava) around 725 CE.

From 10th century onward, historical records use the term "Malavas" to refer to the Paramaras, who ruled the present-day Malwa region. It is probable that the Paramaras were descended from the ancient Malavas. Though they came to be called "Malavas" after they started ruling the Malwa region named after the ancient Malavas.  In the Yadava-prakasha's Vijayanti (c. 11th century), Avanti (the area around Ujjain) and Malava are stated to be identical. Thus, it appears that the present-day definition of Malwa became popular in the later half of the 10th century.

Malava era 

The era, which later became known as the Vikrama Samvat is associated with the Malavas. Initially it was mentioned as the Krita era and then as the Malava era. Most probably this era was mentioned as the Vikrama era for the first time in the Dholpur stone inscription of Chahamana ruler Chandamahasena in 898 CE.

Rulers
 Soma, under whom the Malavas re-asserted their independence from the Sakas of Ujjayini after the death of Rudrasena I
 Vishvavarman circa 423 CE.
 Bandhuvarman, his son and feudatory of Kumaragupta.

See also
 Malwa
 Malwa (Punjab)

References

Bibliography 

 
 
 
 
 
 
 
 

History of Malwa
Ancient peoples of India
Former kingdoms